Franklin Rockefeller (August 8, 1845 – April 15, 1917) was an American businessman and member of the prominent Rockefeller family.

Early life
He and his younger twin sister Frances, who died young, were born on August 8, 1845, in Moravia, New York. They were the youngest children of con artist William Avery "Bill" Rockefeller (1810–1906) and Eliza Davison (1813–1889). His two older brothers were Standard Oil co-founders John Davison Rockefeller (1839–1937) and William Avery Rockefeller Jr. (1841–1922).

Rockefeller's early years were spent in Richford, New York. With his father, he moved to Cleveland, Ohio, which would be the home base of his business endeavors.

Career
In September 1861, while still underage, he joined the 7th Ohio Infantry and participated as an infantryman in the battles of Winchester, Port Republic, Cedar Mountain, Chancellorsville, Gettysburg, Lookout Mountain, and other battles including Sherman's march to Atlanta. He was wounded in the head by grape shot at Chancellorsville.

He held various jobs in Cleveland, eventually becoming involved in his brothers' Standard Oil Co. Frank became one of the principal promoters of the company, and later served as its vice president. However, Rockefeller fell out with his brothers and left Standard Oil in 1898. The rift was caused by John D. not taking consideration of Frank's other interests in the Pioneer Oil Company, and quarrels with Frank's partner, James Corrigan, with whom he owned the Franklin Mine near Lake Superior. He moved with his family to a large ranch in Kansas, but he later returned to Ohio. The 8,000-acre ranch stood on a large tract of cheap land in Belvidere, Kansas, west of Wichita (originally spotted by his father on his travels). The property was remote from railroads, and his cattle could graze on vast, unfenced plains. Eventually the Atchison, Topeka and Santa Fe Railroad brought in fresh settlers shrinking the free range for cattlemen. This ruined the ranch for breeding beef, and Frank tried futilely to sell the depreciated property.

Frank formed a business relationship with Feargus B. Squire and Herman Frasch, acquiring a three-tenths interest in the Frasch Process.  All three then entered into a 50-50 agreement with the American Sulphur Company to form the Union Sulphur Company.

Frank was not as suited to business as his brothers. He invested around $500,000 in mining ventures, which proved unsound, and also invested $250,000 in unfruitful commercial paper. Frank found stability when he invested in the Buckeye Steel Castings Company of Columbus in 1892. He became president of the company in 1905, and served in that capacity until 1908, when the presidency was assumed by Samuel Prescott Bush. Frank Rockefeller continued as vice president of the company.

Frank Rockefeller refused to speak to his brothers John and William Jr. until his death, despite William attempting reconciliation in the summer of 1916. Frank said later that year "There's not the slightest possibility of a reconciliation." Frank died the following year. His funeral was held on April 17, 1917, at the home of Mrs. Walter S. Bowler. The funeral was attended by his brothers, John and William, the former being described in the press as "looking tired and careworn."

References

Further reading
Chernow, Ron. Titan: The Life of John D. Rockefeller Sr. London: Warner Books, 1998.

1845 births
1917 deaths
American businesspeople in the oil industry
American mining businesspeople
Businesspeople from Cleveland
History of Cleveland
Rockefeller family
American people of English descent
American people of German descent
American people of Scotch-Irish descent
People from Moravia, New York
People from Richford, New York
People of Ohio in the American Civil War
Union Army soldiers